was a Japanese actor. He appeared in more than 70 films between 1968 and 2012.

Biography
Chii was the youngest of eight brothers. He made his acting debut in 1968. He made his film debut with Kihachi Okamoto's Kill!. Chii married actress Saori Maki in 1974 and had one daughter with her. Maki died in 2001 from breast cancer.

Chii was initially diagnosed with angina after a hospitalization in 1996, and warned by a doctor to not push himself too hard. Chii had multiple hospitalizations in 2012, after initially going to the hospital in January of that year due to concerns of vision loss. On 29 June 2012, Chii died of heart failure at the age of 70.

Filmography

Film

 Kill! (1968) – Yaheiji Yoshida
 Red Lion (1969) – Spy
 Hangyaku no Melody (1970) – Hoshino
 Hiko shonen: Wakamono no toride (1970) – Jiro Iwami
 Hashi no nai kawa 2 (1970)
  (1970) – Movies starring
 Stray Cat Rock: Wild Jumbo (1970) – Taki
 Shinjuku outlaw: Step On the Gas (1970) – Kamome
 Alleycat Rock: Crazy Riders '71 (1971) – Takaaki
 Senso to ningen II: Ai to kanashimino sanga (1971)
 Hachigatsu no nureta suna (1971) – Ide
 Kumo no Yuna (1971) – Torazô
 Furyo bancho te haccho kuchi haccho (1971)
 Gyangu tai gyangu: Aka to kuro no burûsu (1972)
 Street Mobster (1972)
 Kaigun tokubetsu nenshô-hei (1972) – Kudo
 Erosu no yûwaku (1972) – Shôji
 Dobugawa gakkyu (1972)
 Akai tori nigeta? (1973) – Hasegawa
 Gokiburi deka (1973) – Nobuo Takei
 Retreat Through the Wet Wasteland (1973) – Gorô Harada
 Zenka onna: Koroshi-bushi (1973) – Tetsu Hamada
 Hatachi no genten (1973) – Suzuki
 Lady Snowblood (1973) – Tokuichi Shôkei
 Neon kurage: Shinjuku hanadensha (1973)
 Hissatsu Shikakenin Shunsetsu shikakebari (1974) – Sadaroku
 Tomodachi (1974)
 Honô no shôzô (1974)
 Akan ni hatsu (1975) – Tomoyuki Tonomura
 Minato no Yôko Yokohama yokosuka (1975)
 New Battles Without Honor and Humanity: Last Days of the Boss (1976) – Matsuzo Samukawa
 Ôzora no samurai (1976)
 The Inugami Family (1976) – Suketake Inugami
 Seishun no satsujinsha (1976) – Hidaka, Toru
 Hiroshima jingi: Hitojichi dakkai sakusen (1976)
 Okinawa Yakuza sensô (1976) – Ishikawa
 Yakuza senso: Nihon no Don (1977) – Kawabata
 Hokuriku Proxy War (1977)
 Nihon no jingi (1977) – Tomigashi
 Shin joshuu sasori: Tokushu-bô X (1977) – Prison Guard Ichirô Kajiki
 Botchan (1977)
 Proof of the Man (1977) – Detective Kusaba
 Seishoku no ishibumi (1978)
 Daburu kuracchi (1978)
 Ôgon no inu (1979) – Ryoichi Tanuma
 Ah! Nomugi toge (1979) – Tatsuji Masai
 Tenshi no harawata: Nami (1979) – Tetsuro Muraki
 Torakku yarô: Neppû 5000 kiro (1979)
 Tooi ashita (1979) – Oonoki
 Harukanaru sôro (1980) – Takatoshi Kan
 Tora-san's Promise (1981) – Kenkichi Odajima
 Himeyuri no Tô (1982) – Sergeant Major Ishi
 Gekko kamen (1982)
 F2 grand prix (1984)
 Bi bappu haisukuru (1985) – Onijima Shimazaki
 Be-Bop highschool: Koko yotaro elegy (1986–1988, part 1-5) – Onijima Shimazaki
 Michi (1986)
 Jittemai (1986) – Denzo
 The Tale of the Princess Kaguya (2013) – Okina (voice) (final film role)

Television drama
 Edo no Kaze (1975) (1st season)
 Edo no Gekitou (1979)
  (1981–2002)
 Taiyō ni Hoero! (1982–1986) – Toshizo Igawa (Toshisan)
 Hanekonma (1986)

Other appearances
 Television
  (2006–2012)
Japanese Style Originator (2008–2012)

 Animated Film 
 The Tale of the Princess Kaguya (2013)

 Commercial
 House Foods

References

External links

1942 births
2012 deaths
Japanese male film actors
Actors from Chiba Prefecture
20th-century Japanese male actors